Renán Calle Camacho (born August 9, 1976) is a retired Ecuadorian football defender.

Club career
Calle started his professional playing career in 1999 with Aucas. He had a short spell with El Nacional before returning to Aucas in 2002.

In 2006 Calle returned to El Nacional where he was part of the championship winning team in 2006.

In 2007, he joined LDU Quito where he was part of the team that won the 2007 Ecuadorian Championship. In 2008 he was one of the key members of the LDU squad that won the Copa Libertadores.

Honors
El Nacional
Serie A: 2006
LDU Quito
Serie A: 2007, 2010
Copa Libertadores: 2008
Recopa Sudamericana: 2009, 2010
Copa Sudamericana: 2009

References

External links
 Calle's FEF Player Card
 
Copa Libertadores 2008 profile 

1976 births
Living people
People from Shushufindi Canton
Association football defenders
Ecuadorian footballers
Ecuador international footballers
S.D. Aucas footballers
C.D. El Nacional footballers
L.D.U. Quito footballers
L.D.U. Loja footballers